Casablancas is a Spanish surname. Notable people with the surname include:

Benet Casablancas (born 1956), Spanish composer and musicologist
John Casablancas (b.1942, d.2013), American modeling agent and scout
Julian Casablancas (born 1978), American musician

Fictional characters:
Cassidy and Dick Casablancas, characters in the television series Veronica Mars

See also
Casablanca (disambiguation)

Spanish-language surnames